(The) First Taste may refer to

"The First Taste" (True Blood), a television episode
"The First Taste", a song by Fiona Apple from Tidal
 First Taste (Potliquor album), 1970
 First Taste (Ty Segall album), 2019